Maesteg Celtic Rugby Football Club is a rugby union team from the town of Maesteg, South Wales. Maesteg Celtic RFC presently play in the Welsh Rugby Union Division Three South West League having gained promotion during the 2007/08 season. The club is a member of the Welsh Rugby Union and is a feeder club for the Ospreys. The club fields First, Second, Youth, Junior and Mini teams. In 2019, prop James Williams left the team to join BDSRU as a full time travelling reserve - what an achievement!

Club honours
 WRU Division Four South West 2011/12 - Champions

Notable former players
  Allan Bateman
  Windsor Major
  Howard Nicholls
  Ffion Bowen
  Harri Morgan

References

Welsh rugby union teams
Maesteg